The Province of Asti (Piedmontese: Provincia d’Ast) is a province in the Piedmont region of northern Italy. Its capital is the city of Asti. To the northwest it borders on the Metropolitan City of Turin; to the southwest it borders on the province of Cuneo. To the east it borders on the province of Alessandria, while in the south it shares a very short border with the Ligurian province of Savona.

History

The Province of Asti was re-established on 1 April 1935 by Royal Decree No. 297 of King Victor Emmanuel III. It was detached from the existing Province of Alessandria into which it had been absorbed upon the creation of that province in 1859.

The Province of Asti is among the institutions awarded the Gold Medal for Military Valor (Medaglia d'Oro al Valor Militare) for its contribution to the partisan struggle during the last two years of the Second World War.

Municipalities
There are 118 municipalities (comuni, singular: comune) in the province. the largest by population are:

See also
Piemonte (wine)

References

External links

MonferratoArte A historical and bibliographical directory of artists active in the extra-urban Churches of the Diocese of Casale Monferrato, which includes twenty parishes within the Province of Asti. 

 
Asti